Yasmin Bibi is a Pakistani politician who was a Member of the Provincial Assembly of Balochistan, from May 2013 to May 2018.

Education
She holds the degree of the Master of Arts.

Political career

She was elected to the Provincial Assembly of Balochistan as a candidate of National Party on a reserved seat for women in 2013 Pakistani general election.

References

Living people
Balochistan MPAs 2013–2018
Women members of the Provincial Assembly of Balochistan
Year of birth missing (living people)
21st-century Pakistani women politicians